John Martin Thompson (1829–1907) was a lumberman, Native American tribal and civic leader,  born in the old Cherokee Nation prior to removal in what is now Bartow County, Georgia, USA. He was the son of Benjamin Franklin Thompson, a South Carolinian of Scot-Irish descent, and Annie Martin, a mix blood Cherokee. She was the daughter of Judge John Martin, the first Chief Justice of the Cherokee Nation and Nellie McDaniel.

The Cherokees and the Mount Tabor Indian Community 
Thompson's family had ties to the Cherokee Ridge Party, who supported the removal treaty known as the Treaty of New Echota. In 1848, Thompson's family left the Cherokee Nation in Indian Territory along with other Ridge Party and Old Settler supporters to settle in Rusk County, Texas. B.F. Thompson initially purchased  in the spring of 1844 near present-day Laird Hill, Texas, on which the family made its home. The community later became known as the Mount Tabor Indian Community, the name given to the area by John Adair Bell as recorded in the book Cherokee Cavaliers, (pg 80). J.M. Thompson, although growing up in the Cherokee Nation, in both Georgia and Indian Territory, got his formal education, along with his brother William Wirt Thompson, at the Western Military College, then located at Georgetown, Kentucky. The brothers spent two years at the college before returning to east Texas and becoming deeply involved in the families plantation.

American Civil War
During the American Civil War (1861-1865), most Mount Tabor Cherokees joined Brigadier General Stand Watie, the only Indian to reach the rank of General in the Confederate Army. Watie, his wife and other family members lived at Mount Tabor for short periods during the war. However, John Martin Thompson did not serve or organize units for Watie's Confederate Cherokees. Rather he organized units at Bellview, a town that came from the Mount Tabor Indian Community, to serve with Texas military units. These were made up of the few Cherokees that did not serve with Watie, as well as local Yowani Choctaws and inter-married whites. Thompson who was wounded on multiple occasions during the four year war, quickly rose to the rank of Major in the Confederate Army. The largest loss of life during the war by Mount Tabor Indians that organized under Thompson, was the Battle of Jenkins Ferry in Saline County, Arkansas. This war, both in surrounding states and Indian Territory, took the lives of over 25% of the male population.

Reconstruction
Following the American Civil War, J.M. Thompson became one of the largest lumbermen in Texas. During the reconstruction era and into the early twentieth centuries Thompson along with his sons built their vast holdings in timber through a series of sound business decisions. In 1881, they left the Rusk County area, moving operations into Trinity County in order to market their product via the Missouri–Kansas–Texas Railroad. They facilitated their marketing campaigns by developing connections to retail lumberyards. Further, they organized a series of companies to expedite and manage their ever-growing timber empire. Thus were formed the Thompson and Tucker Lumber Company followed by the J. M. Thompson Lumber Company, the Thompson Brothers Lumber Company, and finally the Thompson and Ford Lumber Company. In 1906, the company relocated all corporate interests to Houston.

Later life 
Although as busy as he was, Thompson was first a family man and community leader. He led the Mount Tabor Indian Community (and by extension the Texas Cherokees and Associate Bands), following the death of William Penn Adair in 1880, until his own death in 1907. He was succeeded as Executive Committee Chairman of the Texas Cherokees and Associate Bands by Chief John Ellis Bean and shortly thereafter by Chairman Claude Muskrat.

His successor and son Hoxie Harry Thompson
His business successor was his son Hoxie Harry Thompson. It was H.H. Thompson who sold  to the United States Forest Service for $12.50 an acre. These lands eventually formed the largest part of the Davy Crockett National Forest. By 1960, Hoxie Thompson had sold neally all of the Thompson lands, but maintained most of the mineral rights.

See also 
 Mount Tabor Indian Community
 Mount Tabor Indian Community
 Mount Tabor Indian Cemetery
 William Clyde Thompson
 Martin Luther Thompson
 Charles Collins Thompson
 Stand Watie
 William Penn Adair
 Yowani Choctaws

Notes

References

Sources 
  Thomas D. Isern and Raymond Wilson, "Lone Star: The Thompson Timber Interests of Texas", Red River Valley Historical Review, #7, 1981
  Thompson Collection, Stephen F. Austin University, Nacogdoches, Texas
  Thomas D. Isern, Handbook of Texas Online: John Martin Thompson
  Republic of Texas Treaties; Treaty of Bowles Village February 23, 1836, Texas State Historical Society, Austin, Texas
  Treaty of Birds Fort September 29, 1843, Texas State Historical Society, Austin, Texas
  Dr. Emmet Starr, Starr's History of the Cherokee Indians
  George Morrison Bell Sr., The Old Mount Tabor Community, Genealogy of Old and New Cherokee Families
  Some East Texas Native Families: Texas Cherokees and Associate Bands Genealogy Project: Rootsweb Global Search: Familyties
  Mary Whatley Clarke, Chief Bowles and Texas Cherokees  (Chapter XI, Cherokee Claims to Land), University of Oklahoma Press, 
  Texas-Cherokees vs United States Docket 26, 26 Ind Cl Comm. 78 (1971)

External links
Thompson Cemetery, Rusk County, Texas; Information related to Cherokee descendants buried there, by Paul Ridenour, 2005
Mount Tabor Indian Cemetery, Rusk County, Texas
Asbury Indian Cemetery, Smith County, Texas, Information related to Choctaw and Cherokee descendants buried there, by Paul Ridenour, 2005
The Handbook of Texas Online: Indians by George Klos
Mt. Tabor Cemetery, Rusk County TxGenWeb
A Starr Studded Event, April 9, 2005, by Paul Ridenour
The George Harlan Starr and Nancy (Bell) Starr Home, Located near Leveretts Chapel, Texas (Mt. Tabor Indian Community) 2005, by Paul Ridenour
Ridenour's Major Ridge Home Page, by Paul Ridenour 2008
Gregg County Historical Markers
Lou Della (Thompson) Crim Home
More Oil-Time Magazine
Kilgore College-History
Texas Ranger Dispatch Magazine 2003
American Lumberman Biographies 2006
The Thompson Collection, Stephen F. Austin State University
"The House of Thompson" Texas Forestry Museum
Handbook of Texas Online: John Martin Thompson, by Thomas D. Isern
Handbook of Texas Online: THOMPSON TIMBER INTERESTS, by Thomas D. Isern
Handbook of Texas Online: Mount Tabor Indian Community by J.C. Thompson and Patrick Pynes

Cherokee Confederates
Native American leaders
1829 births
1907 deaths
Cherokee Nation people (1794–1907)
20th-century Native Americans